Ian K. Smith (born July 15, 1969) is an American physician, author and television host best known for hosting The Doctors. In 2007, he launched the 50 Million Pound Challenge, a national weight loss initiative sponsored by CVS Pharmacy and State Farm.

He has also made appearances on VH1's Celebrity Fit Club series, The View, and as a correspondent for NBC News. He is also the host of HealthWatch with Dr. Ian Smith, a daily news feature. Smith has authored a number of books related to health and weight loss, as well as three crime novels.

Education
Smith and his twin brother Dana, natives of Danbury, Connecticut, graduated from Immaculate High School (Danbury). Ian received a Bachelor of Arts from Harvard College in 1992, and a Masters in Science Education from Columbia University in 1993.

He attended Dartmouth Medical School, then completed the last two years of his medical education and graduated from the University of Chicago Pritzker School of Medicine.

Professional career
Smith hosts HealthWatch with Dr. Ian Smith, a nationally syndicated daily news feature heard on American Urban Radio Networks. In 2010, Smith was appointed to the President's Council on Sports, Fitness, and Nutrition.

50 Million Pound Challenge 
In April 2007, Smith launched the 50 Million Pound Challenge in partnership with State Farm Insurance. The challenge was a national health initiative encouraging awareness of fitness and the risks of obesity. The Challenge was a free campaign supported by national civic and health organizations with the purpose of reducing the impact of high blood pressure, cardiac disease and obesity in the United States.

The 50 Million Pounds website developed a partnership with CVS Pharmacy. In partnership with CVS, the 50 Million Pound Challenge participated in a series of free community health events in urban communities in the United States, with a particular focus on improving health outcomes in the African-American community. CVS will hosted over 250 "To Your Health" fairs in cities such as Atlanta, Washington, D.C. and Philadelphia, providing health risk assessments and screenings for common chronic health issues including diabetes, blood pressure, high cholesterol and Osteoporosis. The fairs included celebrity guests such as Biz Markie, Steve Harvey, Patti LaBelle and Yolanda Adams.

Writing 
Smith has written a dozen books including The Fat Smash Diet, a 90-day diet program that focuses on "smashing" bad eating and exercise habits and establishing new healthy ones. His book Happy was released in April 2010. His book The Truth About Men was released in April 2012, Shred: The Revolutionary Diet was released in December 2012, and Super Shred: The Big Results Diet was published in December 2013. In 2015, Smith published The Shred Diet Cookbook and The Shred Power Cleanse.

He has also written articles and essays for Time, Newsweek, Men's Health, and the New York Daily News, and has been featured in other publications including People, Essence, Ebony, Cosmopolitan, and University of Chicago Medicine on the Midway.

Smith later began writing fiction novels, starting with The Blackbird Chronicles in 2005, about a murdered Dartmouth professor. Smith later wrote The Ancient Nine (2018) and The Unspoken (2020), with the latter being the first in a planned series about Ashe Cayne, a black police officer who refuses to participate in police corruption. Smith has said that The Unspoken was inspired by the real life murder of Laquan McDonald.

Television 
Smith co-hosted season six of the health talk show The Doctors in 2014-2015. Beginning September 12, 2020, he has been its sole host, as the show switched from a panel of hosts to a sole host format.

Smith was the medical and diet expert on VH1's Celebrity Fit Club. He also appeared extensively on various broadcasts including The View, The Tyra Banks Show, Larry King Live, Anderson Cooper 360°, Showbiz Tonight, Verdict with Dan Abrams, The Rachael Ray Show, and  Opie and Anthony.

Personal life 
Ian Smith married health executive Tristé Noelle Lieteau on May 29, 2005. In 2018, the couple sold their townhome in the South Loop and moved to a mansion in Kenwood, Chicago.

Bibliography
 The Take-Control Diet (2001) 
 The Fat Smash Diet (2006) 
 Extreme Fat Smash Diet (2007) 
 The 4 Day Diet (2009) 
 Happy: Simple Steps to Get the Most Out of Life (2010) 
 EAT: The Effortless Weight Loss Solution (2011) 
 Shred: The Revolutionary Diet (2012) 
 The Truth About Men: The Secret Side of the Opposite Sex (2012) 
 Super Shred: The Big Results Diet (2013) 
 The Shred Diet Cookbook (2015) 
 The Shred Power Cleanse (2015) 
 Blast the Sugar Out! (2017) 
 The Clean 20 (2018) 
Clean and Lean (2019) 
Mind over Weight (2020) 
Fast Burn! (2021)
Plant Power (2022)

Fiction (As Ian Smith) 

 The Blackbird Papers (2004) 
 The Ancient Nine (2018) 
The Unspoken (2020)

References

External links
Official Website

American exercise and fitness writers
American health and wellness writers
American medical writers
Physicians from Illinois
American self-help writers
American television journalists
Teachers College, Columbia University alumni
Geisel School of Medicine alumni
Diet food advocates
Harvard College alumni
NBC News people
People from Danbury, Connecticut
Pritzker School of Medicine alumni
1969 births
Living people
American male journalists
Journalists from New York City
African-American physicians
African-American novelists
21st-century African-American people
20th-century African-American people